Lawrence Washington Hall (1819January 18, 1863) was an American lawyer and politician who served as a U.S. Representative from Ohio from 1857 to 1859.

Early life and career 
Born in Lake County, Ohio, Hall graduated from Hudson College in 1839 where he studied law. He was admitted to the bar in 1843 and began to practice in Bucyrus, Ohio, from 1844.

He served as prosecuting attorney of Crawford County from 1845-1851; then as judge of the Court of Common Pleas from 1852 - 1857.

Congress 
Hall was elected as a Democrat to the Thirty-fifth Congress, serving from March 4, 1857, to March 3, 1859.

Later career and death 
He subsequently resumed his law practice, having lost the reelection bid. In 1862, during the Civil War, he was imprisoned for alleged disloyalty to the Union.

He died in Bucyrus, Ohio, on January 18, 1863, and was interred in Oakwood Cemetery.

Sources

1819 births
1863 deaths
People from Lake County, Ohio
Copperheads (politics)
People from Bucyrus, Ohio
County district attorneys in Ohio
Ohio state court judges
Democratic Party members of the United States House of Representatives from Ohio
19th-century American politicians
19th-century American judges